Jestřebí may refer to places in the Czech Republic:

Jestřebí (Česká Lípa District), a municipality and village in the Liberec Region
Jestřebí (Náchod District), a municipality and village in the Hradec Králové Region
Jestřebí (Šumperk District), a municipality and village in the Olomouc Region
Rájec-Jestřebí, a town in the South Moravian Region
Jestřebí hory, a mountain range

See also
 Jestřabí (disambiguation)